Yesterday Is Time Killed is the debut studio album by Eighteen Visions. It was released in early 1999 through Cedargate Records. Five songs were later re-recorded for the band's third album, The Best of Eighteen Visions. The last untitled song is actually split into 8 tracks, for each "part" of the song.

Track listing

Personnel
Eighteen Visions
James Hart – vocals, layout
Brandan Schieppati – guitar
Javier Van Huss – bass
Ken Floyd – drums

Additional
Produced by Jeff Forrest
Artwork by Troy Peace
Photography by Greg Young and Jeffrey Morse
Layout by Paul Miner

References

Eighteen Visions albums
1999 debut albums